Francis Awerkamp (born September 20, 1980) is an American politician who has served in the Kansas House of Representatives from the 61st district since 2017.

References

1980 births
Living people
Republican Party members of the Kansas House of Representatives
21st-century American politicians
People from St. Marys, Kansas